Robert Gardelle (1682-1766) was a Swiss artist, engraver and etcher born in Geneva, then in the Republic of Geneva. Gardelle studied under Largillière in Paris, where he distinguished himself as a portrait painter, producing also etchings of portraits and of views of Geneva. Gardelle is known for both the quantity of portraits he produced and the speed with which he produced them; Cambridge University Library noted during a 1978 exhibition that Gardelle was prolific and "often painted portraits in two or three days."

References

Further reading
 Dagmar Böcker: Gardelle, Robert. In: Historisches Lexikon der Schweiz
 Auguste Bouvier: Quatre vues de Genève peintes par Robert Gardelle, Genève 1931
 Waldemar Deonna: Le peintre Robert Gardelle 1682-1766. Impr. du "Journal de Genève", 1943

18th-century artists from the Republic of Geneva
1682 births
1766 deaths
Engravers from the Republic of Geneva
18th-century engravers
18th-century Swiss painters
18th-century Swiss male artists